Narasingapuram is a census town in Vellore district in the Indian state of Tamil Nadu.

Demographics
 India census, Narasingapuram had a population of 10,555. Males constitute 50% of the population and females 50%. Narasingapuram has an average literacy rate of 76%, higher than the national average of 59.5%: male literacy is 82%, and female literacy is 71%. In Narasingapuram, 9% of the population is under 6 years of age.

References

Cities and towns in Vellore district